Rizvan or Rızvan is a Turkish masculine given name. Notable people with the name include:

Rizvan
Rizvan Ablitarov (born 1989), Ukrainian footballer
Rizvan Chitigov (1964–2005), prominent Chechen rebel field commander
Rizvan Farzaliyev (born 1979), Azerbaijani futsal player
Rizvan Gadzhiev (born 1987), Dagestan ASSR born Belarus freestyle wrestler 
Rizvan Geliskhanov (born 1963), Soviet weightlifter of Chechen origin
Rizvan Pashayev (1949–2007), Azerbaijani mathematician
Rizvan Rahman (born 1970), Pakistani-born British painter
Rizvan Sadayev (born 1979), Russian footballer 
Rızvan Şahin (born 1989), Turkish footballer
Rizvan Umarov (born 1993), Russian-born Azeri footballer 
Rizvan Utsiyev (born 1988), Russian footballer
Rizvan Ay (born 1989), German Full Stack-Developer

Rızvan
Rızvan Özbey (born 1948), Turkish cross-country skier

See also
 Ridvan

Turkish masculine given names